Farzad Jafari is an Iranian football defender. Since 2021, he has played for Iranian football club Havadar in the Persian Gulf Pro League.

Club career
Jafari started his career with Esteghlal Ahvaz at the youth level. He was promoted to Division 1 in 2012. He was a regular starter in his first season with Esteghlal Ahvaz. In winter 2013, he joined Esteghlal Khuzestan with a 3 year contract. He made his debut for Esteghlal Khuzestan on 19 December 2013 against Malavan as a starter.

Club career statistics

References

External links
 Farzad Jafari at PersianLeague.com
 Farzad Jafari at IranLeague.ir

1993 births
Living people
Iranian footballers
Esteghlal Ahvaz players
Esteghlal Khuzestan players
People from Dezful
Association football fullbacks
Sportspeople from Khuzestan province